Diamond Island (lit. "Diamond Island") is a satellite city in Phnom Penh on the Mekong and Bassac rivers.

The land was a swamp until the year 2000, but it is now (2017) under work and could become the Phnom Penh residential district and a separate municipality.

A neighborhood named "Elysée" has a style inspired by Paris. In other areas, high towers are under construction.

Almost all of the island is in Chamkar Mon Section.

Education
The Canadian International School of Phnom Penh has its main campus in Koh Pich; this campus opened in 2015.

Gallery

The 2010 accident 
The Phnom Penh stampede was a deadly stampede that occurred during the Water Festival at Diamond Island in Cambodia. It resulted in 347 people being killed and at least 755 being injured.

References

External links 

 Project for the island 
 A film

 
Islands of Cambodia
Planned cities in Cambodia